Thailand started sending athletes to the Southeast Asian Games in 1959 as a Founding member of the Southeast Asian Games Federation (SEAGF) alongside Burma (now Myanmar), Kampuchea (now Cambodia), Laos, Malaya (now Malaysia), and the Republic of Vietnam (South Vietnam). Thailand first competed in the Southeast Asian Peninsular Games (SEAPG) from its namesake of "Peninsular" meaning the Peninsular nations of Southeast Asia would be competing in the said games. There were 8 events held as a Southeast Asian Peninsular Games, 3 of which were held in Thailand. The 1963 edition of the games that would have been hosted by Cambodia was cancelled due to domestic political situation within the nation.

In 1975, the last Southeast Asian Peninsular Games were held in Thailand before being renamed to Southeast Asian Games after expressed interest of competing from island nations in Southeast Asia such as Indonesia, the Philippines and Singapore just of the coast of Malaysia. Thailand hosted the first edition of these games with the new name in 1985, ten years after the 1975 edition.

Thailand in the Southeast Asian Games is considered to be one of the toughest competitors in numerous events as they have established themselves as a powerhouse in the sports world in Southeast Asia. They have consistently ranked in the Top 3 of Medal Tallies alongside Indonesia, the Philippines, Singapore and Vietnam. In the most-recent 2019 Southeast Asian Games in the Philippines, Thailand ranked third in the medal tally behind the host country and Vietnam.

Thailand is set to host the 2025 Southeast Asian Games, after 18 years. The last time Thailand hosted the Games was in 2007 in Nakhon Ratchasima.

Southeast Asian Games

Medals by Games 

1959 in Thailand
History of sport in Thailand
Southeast Asian Games